Cinochira is a genus of flies in the family Tachinidae.

Species
C. atra Zetterstedt, 1845
C. mitis (Reinhard, 1957)

References

Phasiinae
Tachinidae genera
Taxa named by Johan Wilhelm Zetterstedt